Masjid Tanah (Chinese: 馬日丹那) is a town and parliamentary constituency in northwestern Malacca, Malaysia, bordering Negeri Sembilan across the Linggi River.

History
According to local oral folklore, Masjid Tanah was first settled by Minangkabau people along with local Malays from Malacca Sultanate Empire in the 14th–15th centuries.

Masjid Tanah once belonged to the state of Naning until the British conquest in 1832 when it was integrated to the Straits Settlement of Malacca.

The name of Masjid Tanah comes from a mosque (masjid) that was built from soil (tanah) by a sheikh from Gujarat around 1800. This mosque was also maintained by a local named Hj. Sulong bin Sibeng. The mosque that was built from soil was demolished later but reconstructed in 1951. This mosque was utilized by several nearby kampungs (villages).

In the late 1990s, there was a real estate boom in Masjid Tanah when the government decided to build a Petronas oil refinery in nearby Sungai Udang. It has many beaches in Pengkalan Balak, 7 km away, and is close to Kuala Sungai Baru.

Administration 
Each kampung in the constituency has their own leader (ketua kampung). Most of the kampungs are named after plant species. This tradition of taking the name based on plants is probably influenced by the concept of the name of Melaka itself. Melaka is in fact a name of a tree.

Masjid Tanah is presently administered by Alor Gajah Municipal Council (Majlis Perbandaran Alor Gajah, MPAG). Since 2021, there is a proposal to detach Masjid Tanah as a separate district from Alor Gajah, pending final approval from the Federal Government.

Demographics 
Population of Masjid Tanah constituency is 95,689 according to the 2020 census, of which 91% are Malays.

Masjid Tanah, located in the northwestern part of Melaka is very near to Negeri Sembilan. Hence, most of its people are the descendants of Minangkabau people, similar to Negeri Sembilan. They usually carry "Loghat Hulu" (a dialect in Malay language also similar to Negeri Sembilan but slightly different) or Minang accent, and shared the same culture of Adat Perpatih. In some kampung the "culture of working together" or "gotong royong" was still implemented. But most of the culture is now forgotten. The young preferred to work in urban areas and the houses in the kampungs are mostly uninhabited.

Educational institutions
 SMK Ghafar Baba
 SMK Sultan Alauddin 
 SMK Hang Kasturi
 Sekolah Menengah Imtiaz Ulul Albab Melaka
 Masjid Tanah Community College
 MARA College of High Skills
 National Youth Institute of High Skills (IKTBN)
 Malacca Matriculation College,
 Poultry Institute of Technology (ITU)

Sports and recreation
 Hang Jebat Sailing Centre, Pengkalan Balak

Tourist attractions
 Al-Khawarizmi Astronomy Complex - An observatory owned by the Malacca Islamic Religious Council. The astronomy complex is named after astronomer Muhammad ibn Musa al-Khwarizmi. It was developed in different stages: the first being the observatory established in 2002, followed by the planetarium in 2005 and finally the training centre in 2008. The total cost for its development was RM20 million.
 Tanjung Bidara Beach
 Turtle Conservation and Information Centre
 Pengkalan Balak Beach

Notable natives
Datuk Abu Seman Yusop, the former Malaysian Deputy of Home Minister (2009–2013), comes from this town. He is also the former Member of Parliament for Masjid Tanah.

Since 2013, Mas Ermieyati Samsudin (Perikatan Nasional) is the MP for Masjid Tanah. She is the first female MP in the constituency's history/

See also

 Masjid Tanah (federal constituency)
 List of cities and towns in Malaysia by population

References

Mukims of Malacca